The Federal Court of Canada, which succeeded the Exchequer Court of Canada in 1971, was a national court of Canada that had limited jurisdiction to hear certain types of disputes arising under the federal government's legislative jurisdiction.  Originally composed of two divisions, the Appellate Division and the Trial Division, in 2003 the Court was split into two separate Courts, the Federal Court and the Federal Court of Appeal.  The jurisdiction and powers of the two courts remained largely unchanged from the predecessor divisions.

The court used facilities as the Supreme Court of Canada Building as well as Thomas D'Arcy McGee Building and registry office at 90 Elgin Street.

History

Pre-Confederation to Confederation
Prior to Confederation, the predominantly English-speaking Canada West (which succeeded Upper Canada) and the predominantly French-speaking Canada East (which succeeded Lower Canada) each had a separate system of courts. During pre-Confederation negotiations, the creation of a national court had been contemplated to deal with matters relating to federal law. The Constitution Act, 1867 thus provided under s. 101 that:

The Parliament of Canada may, notwithstanding anything in this Act, from Time to Time provide for the Constitution, Maintenance, and Organization of a General Court of Appeal for Canada, and for the Establishment of any additional Courts for the better Administration of the Laws of Canada.

Despite the language in the constitution, a national court was not established until 1875. Prime Minister John A. Macdonald made several attempts between 1869 and 1873 to create a national court under the powers granted to Parliament under s. 101 of the Constitution Act, 1867. However, these early attempts were rebuffed due to concerns over jurisdiction, particularly because the early proposals would have established a federal Supreme Court exercising both original (trial) jurisdiction and concurrent appellate jurisdiction potentially in conflict with existing courts administered by Ontario and Quebec.

While no court per se was created, provision was made for the appointment of Official Arbitrators, whose decisions soon became subject to a final appeal to a Board of Arbitrators, until a further right of appeal to the new Exchequer Court was created in 1879.

Exchequer Court
In 1875, the Liberal government of Prime Minister Alexander Mackenzie passed The Supreme and Exchequer Court Act (introduced by Minister of Justice Telesphore Fournier), which was based on Macdonald's earlier unsuccessful bill of 1870. This act created both the Supreme Court of Canada and the Exchequer Court. The jurisdiction of the Exchequer Court was provided under sections 58 and 59 of the Act:

The Supreme and Exchequer Court Act made it clear that the Exchequer Court of Canada was inspired by the Court of Exchequer in England, both in name and in jurisdiction, focusing as it did on matters of revenue. In the same year, however, England abolished the Court of Exchequer, merging its jurisdiction into the High Court of Justice. Nonetheless, the jurisdiction provided to the Exchequer Court of Canada initially consisted of:

 concurrent original jurisdiction over all cases relating to the enforcement of the revenue laws;
 exclusive original jurisdiction over any demand or relief sought in like manner as the English Court of Exchequer in its revenue side; and
 concurrent original jurisdiction over all civil cases where the Crown is the plaintiff or petitioner.

The independence of the Exchequer Court was not immediately established. Indeed, justices of the Supreme Court also sat as justices of the Exchequer Court in the early years. The two Courts were not separated until 1887, at which time the functions of the Official Arbitrators were subsumed into the Exchequer Court. George W. Burbidge, a lawyer from New Brunswick, was the first Exchequer Court judge appointed under this new arrangement. At the same time, the Court's jurisdiction was expanded to include exclusive original jurisdiction over all claims against the Crown.

Jurisdiction over railway insolvency
Beginning in 1901, railways gained the ability under the Railway Act to apply to the Court to secure a scheme of arrangement in the event of insolvency.

Acquisition of admiralty jurisdiction
While s. 96 of the BNA Act, 1867 constituted the superior courts in the provinces, admiralty law jurisdiction was not conferred on them, which continued to be vested in the vice-admiralty courts under the British Vice Admiralty Courts Act, 1863. Separate courts existed in British Columbia, Lower Canada, New Brunswick and Nova Scotia. The absence of such a court for Ontario led to the Parliament of Canada, exercising its power under s. 101, to create the Maritime Court of Ontario through the passage of the Maritime Jurisdiction Act 1877. This was held to be a valid exercise of federal jurisdiction by the Supreme Court of Canada in 1879.

This mix of courts was rationalized after the British Parliament passed the Colonial Courts of Admiralty Act 1890, where British possessions were authorized to create their own courts of admiralty jurisdiction. This was followed shortly with the passage of the Admiralty Act 1891, which consolidated such jurisdiction throughout Canada in the Exchequeur Court of Canada, which under the British Act "may exercise such jurisdiction in like manner and to as full an extent as the High Court in England, and shall have the same regard as that Court to international law and the comity of nations."

The extent of this jurisdiction was held to be only that which existed on 1 July 1891, in an appeal decided in 1927 by the Judicial Committee of the Privy Council. This situation only changed after the Statute of Westminster 1931 came into force, after which Canada passed the Admiralty Act 1934, which broadened Canadian admiralty jurisdiction to match that of the High Court of England at that time:

Federal Court of Canada
In 1971, the Federal Court of Canada was established, consisting of two divisions (the "Federal Court – Trial Division" and the "Federal Court – Appeal Division"), inheriting much of the jurisdiction of the Exchequer Court. The Federal Court of Canada gained the jurisdiction to hear judicial reviews from federal agencies and tribunals. With respect to maritime jurisdiction, the Trial Division was declared to have:

On July 2, 2003, the Court was split into two separate Courts, with the "Trial Division" continued as the Federal Court and the "Appeal Division" continued as the Federal Court of Appeal.

Until 1976, there was substantial judicial support for the view that Parliament could give a federal court jurisdiction over any matter (even a matter not regulated by federal statute law), on the basis that "the Laws of Canada" meant not only federal statutes, but provincial ones as well. However, in Quebec North Shore Paper Co. v. Canadian Pacific, the Supreme Court of Canada rejected this notion, as:

 provincial law is not pro tanto federal law, nor can it be transposed into federal law for the purposes of giving jurisdiction to the Federal Court.
 judicial jurisdiction of the Federal Court is not co-extensive with legislative jurisdiction of Parliament, as "the Laws of Canada" carries the requirement that there be applicable and existing federal law

Organization
The Court consisted of a first-level trial court, known as the Federal Court of Canada – Trial Division, and an appellate Court, known as the Federal Court of Canada – Appeal Division (more commonly referred to as the Federal Court of Appeal).

The Trial Division had jurisdiction to hear judicial review of decisions of federal boards and tribunals, including most immigration matters, as well as jurisdiction in admiralty, intellectual property, and disputes involving the federal government.

The Appeal Division had jurisdiction to hear appeals of decisions of the Trial Division, as well as to determine applications for judicial review of decisions made by specific boards and tribunals, set out in section 28 of the Federal Court Act.  Decisions of the Appeal Division could be appealed to the Supreme Court of Canada, but only if leave (permission) was granted by either court.

The court did not use juries so all matters were decided by judge alone: a single judge in the Trial Division and a panel of three judges at the appeal level.  Some pre-trial steps such as motions were decided by prothonotaries, a role similar to a master in other courts.  The judges and prothonotaries were appointed by the Cabinet of the federal government.

Jurisdiction
Unlike the general courts set up by each province, matters could not be brought before the Federal Court of Canada unless a law explicitly allowed the proceeding.  The docket of the court primarily consisted of judicial reviews of immigration, intellectual property, and federal employment disputes. The court could also deal with incidental aspects of a dispute that fell outside its jurisdiction if the primary dispute was within its jurisdiction.

The court was a national court so trials and hearings occurred throughout Canada.  Any orders rendered by the court were enforceable in all the provinces and territories.  This contrasts with the provincial superior courts which are organized by each province and require additional steps to enforce decisions in other provinces.

Presidents of the Exchequer Court of Canada

The position of President of the Court was not created until 1923. Before that time, justices of the Supreme Court of Canada sat as judges of the Exchequer Court from 1875 to 1887, at which time George Wheelock Burbidge was appointed as the first full-time judge of the Court. He served until 1908. when Walter Cassels was appointed. In 1912, authority was given to appoint an associate judge to the Court, and Louis Arthur Audette was appointed to that position. In 1945, authority was given to appoint more judges to the Court.

From 1923, the Presidents of the Court were:

 Sir Walter Gibson Pringle Cassels, 19201923
 Alexander Kenneth Maclean, 19231942
 Joseph Thorarinn Thorson, 19421964
 Wilbur Roy Jackett, 19641971 (subsequently Chief Justice of the Federal Court of Canada)

Judges

Current judges

Prior judges
The judges of this court are listed below.

 = former judge of the Exchequer Court of Canada
 = stepped down from original appointment
† = died in office

See also
Court system of Canada
Law of Canada

References

Further reading
 
 
Louis Arthur Audette. The Practice of the Exchequer Court of Canada. Printed at the office of Thoburn. 1895. Google Books. Second Edition. Copeland-Chatterson-Crain. 1909. Google Books
Robert Cassels. Manual of Procedure in the Supreme and Exchequer Courts of Canada. R Carswell. Toronto. 1877. Internet Archive

External links
Official web site as of October 2002 (via the Internet Archive Wayback Machine)
Courts Administration Service Act, S.C. 2002, c. 8 (restructuring the Court, effective July 2, 2003) (as originally enacted)

 
Defunct courts
Federal Court of Canada (now defunct)
Legal history of Canada
1971 establishments in Canada
2003 disestablishments in Canada
Courts and tribunals established in 1971
Courts and tribunals disestablished in 2005